Charlie Chaplin is a 2002 Indian Tamil-language comedy film directed by Sakthi Chidambaram, starring Prabhu and Prabhu Deva. Abhirami, Gayathri Raghuraman and Livingston play other supporting roles. It released on 15 February 2002 and become a commercial success. Prabhu had won the Tamil Nadu State Film Award Special Prize for his performance in the film.
The film's commercial success led to remakes in several languages, such as in Telugu as Pellam Oorelithe, Hindi as No Entry, Malayalam as Happy Husbands, Kannada as Kalla Malla Sulla, Marathi as No Entry Pudhe Dhoka Aahey and in Bengali as Kelor Kirti.

Plot
Ramakrishnan is a rich businessman in Ooty who owns an advertising company and tea estates. He is married to Mythili who is very possessive about her husband. Mythili always suspects her husband fearing that he would end up having an affair with some other girl as they are childless after 5 years of marriage, and this brings frequent quarrel between the couple. But Ramakrishnan is a kind hearted honest man and he takes care of his wife with great love.

Thirunavukkarasu is a poor photographer in the same town and initially, Ramakrishnan misunderstands Thiru to be a rogue. Later understands his good nature and provides him a job in his own company. Thiru, who was orphaned after his mom died 3 years ago, is very loyal to Ramakrishnan and Mythili and respects Ramakrishnan as his brother. Ramakrishnan is also very kind to Thiru. One day, Thiru meets a girl Susi and the two fall in love with each other. Susi is a social activist who voices for women empowerment, and daughter of a district judge.

Vishwa is a close friend of Ramakrishnan and is married to Amudha. But Vishwa is a playboy and has affairs with many girls. One day, a small quarrel erupts between Ramakrishnan and Mythili following which Ramakrishnan worries thinking about his wife's continuous suspecting behaviour. Vishwa plans to relax Ramakrishnan by engaging a call girl Thilothama.

Ramakrishnan although not interested in it, finally decides to spend some time with Thiliothama when Mythili is away to Tirupathi. Thilothama comes to Ramakrishnan's guest house where Thiru lives. Suddenly, Mythili cancels her trip and returns home. On the way, she finds Ramakrishnan's car in Thiru's home and she also comes to Thiru's home. Mythili gets shocked to see Thilothama and Ramakrishnan in Thiru's home. Ramakrishnan suddenly manages the situation by lying that Thilothama is none other than Thiru's lover. Mythili believes this while Thiru does not reveal the truth knowing that it would separate Ramakrishnan from Mythili.

Then it is cat and mouse game where Thiru tries to act as Thilothama's love in front of Mythili, at the same time tries hard not to get caught by Susi as she is short-tempered and hates someone lying to her. Finally, Mythili and Susi get to know about the lies told by Thiru and Ramakrishnan. Ramakrishnan and Thiru try hard to find Thilothama and make her tell the truth that nothing happened between them. But to their surprise, Thilothama committed suicide and they have no other proof now.

Susi decides to break up with Thiru while Mythili applies for divorce with Ramakrishnan. Finally, in the court, Ramakrishnan expresses how much he loves Mythili and tells all the truth and requests her to believe him. Also, Amudha and Vishwa convince Susi and Mythili whereby Amudha says that she very well knows about Vishwa's affair with so many girls but she still lives with a hope of getting him back as a loyal husband someday. Mythili and Susi understand Ramakrishnan and Thiru's good nature and they unite in the end.

Cast
 Prabhu as Ramakrishnan
 Prabhu Deva as Thirunavukkarasu (Thiru)
 Livingston as Vishwa
 Abhirami as Mythili Ramakrishnan
 Gayathri Raghuraman as Suseela (Susi)
 Vindhya as Amudha Vishwa
 Monal as Thilothama
 Pyramid Natarajan as Judge Samandham, Suseela's Father
 Chinni Jayanth as Thirupathiraj
 Mahanadi Shankar
 Pandu
 Besant Ravi
 Priyanka as Lakshmi (Home maid)

Production
Sakthi Chidambaram revealed that the story was based on a real life incident that had happened to his friend, but altered the happenings to present it in a comedy format. The film was initially called Uthama Purushan, but was later changed to Charlie Chaplin. The initial choices for the two leading female roles had been Gayatri Jayaraman and Sanghavi, but the two were replaced due to date issues.

Soundtrack

There are the 7 songs in this film composed by Bharani.

Remakes
The film's commercial success led to remakes in several languages, such as, In Hindi as No Entry, Telugu as Pellam Oorelithe, Malayalam as Happy Husbands, Kannada as Kalla Malla Sulla, Marathi as No Entry Pudhe Dhoka Aahey and in Bengali as Kelor Kirti.

Sequel

Legacy
It is the one among the second highest remade film in Indian cinema after Nuvvostanante Nenoddantana (nine languages) along with Anuraga Aralithu, Poovinu Puthiya Poonthenal, Kireedam, Pavitra Bandham, Don, Vikramarkudu, Shutter,  Brindavanam, Drishyam, U Turn, Naduvula Konjam Pakkatha Kaanom, Thiruvilaiyaadal Aarambam, Kaadhal and Okkadu– all of which have been remade six times. A sequel titled Charlie Chaplin 2 released in 2019. The core plot of the movie is loosely based on the 1975 Tamil movie Yarukku Maappillai Yaro.

References

External links
 

2002 films
Tamil films remade in other languages
2000s Tamil-language films
Indian comedy films
2002 comedy films
Films directed by Sakthi Chidambaram